The  was one of the four assemblies set up in France by the Constitution of Year VIII (the other three were the Council of State, the  and the ). Its first president was the historian Pierre Daunou, whose independent spirit led to his dismissal from the post by Napoleon Bonaparte in 1802.

Elections 
As with elections to the Corps législatif, members of the Tribunat were not elected by direct universal suffrage. They were chosen via a complex process by the Senate from the "national lists of notables" ("listes nationales de notabilités") set up following a series of votes "en cascade" - the citizens would first elect "communal notables" from one tenth of their number, who would choose "departmental notables" from one tenth of their number, who would in turn choose "national notables" from another one tenth of their number.

Functions 
The Tribunat's function was to send three orators to discuss proposed laws with government orators in the presence of the Corps législatif. It could not vote on such laws, but its decisions did have some consequence, if only as a consultative opinion, with the final decision always coming back as a last resort to the First Consul, who might or might not take the Tribunat's opinion into account. The Tribunat could also ask the Senate to overturn "the lists of eligibles, the acts of the Legislative Body and those of the government" on account of unconstitutionality, but the Tribunat's opinion was, once again, non-binding.

History 
Shortly after the coup d'état of 18 Brumaire, the Tribunat became a focus of opposition to the regime the First Consul was in the process of setting up. Also, on 7 January, Benjamin Constant entered  the Tribunat and, in a speech that made him leader of the opposition, denounced "the regime of servitude and silence" Bonaparte was preparing. The Tribunat was made up of liberal personalities like Constant, whose independent point of view Bonaparte saw as prejudicial to the public order and political unity he was trying to establish. Thus it was first purged after its opposition to the projected Code civil in 1802 (a purge made possible by a manoeuvre - the Tribunat was partially renewed at the regular interval, but it was unknown who in the Tribunat would be the first to be removed, and therefore Napoleon chose his opponents), then suppressed by a decree of the Senate in 1807, with its remaining functions and members absorbed into the Corps législatif.

It is notable that the Corps législatif tended to reinforce the powers of the executive. The introduction of the plebiscite, reducing the chambers' legitimacy and thus their power, had the same aim. The Tribunat was an organ intended to improve separation of powers, but the way that the separation of powers was structured did not let the Tribunat run effectively.

Organisation and constitution
The Constitution of Year VIII organised the Tribunat:

The Constitution of 16 thermidor year X (4 August 1802) foresaw:

The Constitution of the Year XII stated that:

Sessions
1st session: from 1 January 1800 (11 nivôse year VIII) to 7 November 1800 (16 brumaire year IX).
2nd session: from 22 November 1800 (1 frimaire year IX) to 7 November 1801 (16 brumaire year X).
3rd session: from 22 November 1801 (1 frimaire year X) to 14 August 1802 (26 thermidor year X).
4th session: from 20 August 1802 (2 fructidor year X) to 20 August 1803 (2 fructidor year XI).
5th session: from 26 September 1803 (3 vendémiaire year XII) to 2 June 1804 (13 prairial year XII).
6th session: from 2 December 1804 (11 frimaire year XIII) to 30 December 1805 (9 nivôse year XIV).
7th session: from 1 January 1806 to 12 May 1806.
8th session: from 14 August 1807 to 18 September 1807.

References

First French Empire
French Consulate
1799 establishments in France
1807 disestablishments
Historical legislatures in France